Dyschirius saudiarabicus is a species of ground beetle in the subfamily Scaritinae. It was described by Balkenohl in 1994.

References

saudiarabicus
Beetles described in 1994